Davinder Singh Kang (born 18 December 1988) is an Indian track and field athlete who competes in the javelin throw event. Kang won the bronze medal at the 2017 Asian Athletics Championships with a throw of 83.29m. At the 2017 World Championships in Athletics in August 2017, he became the first Indian to qualify for the final of the javelin throw event at the World Athletics Championships with a throw of 84.22m, the seventh best mark in the qualification round.

References

External links
 

1988 births
Indian male javelin throwers
Athletes from Punjab, India
Sportspeople from Jalandhar
World Athletics Championships athletes for India
Living people